Gregory Keith Harris (born 1948) is an American lawyer serving as the United States Attorney for the Central District of Illinois.

Early life and education 
Harris was born in Washington, D.C. He earned a Bachelor of Arts degree from Howard University in 1971 and a Juris Doctor from the University of Illinois Chicago School of Law in 1976.

Career 
Harris began his career as a lawyer for the Office of the State Appellate Defender in 1976 where he represented indigent criminal defendants on appeal. From 1979 to 1980, he served as legal counsel for the Illinois Governor's Office of Manpower and Human Development and later as a staff attorney for the Illinois Department of Commerce and Community Development. From 1980 to 1988, he served as an assistant United States attorney in the United States Attorney's Office for the Central District of Illinois. From 1988 to 2001, he was a lawyer for Giffin, Winning, Cohen & Bodewes in Springfield, Illinois. He became an equity partner of the firm in 1992. He later rejoined the Central District of Illinois in 2001, where he served as chief of the Criminal Division and assistant United States attorney.

U.S. attorney for the Central District of Illinois 

On October 27, 2021, President Joe Biden announced Harris as a nominee to be United States attorney for the Central District of Illinois. On December 2, 2021, his nomination was reported out of committee by a voice vote. On December 7, 2021, his nomination was confirmed in the United States Senate. He was sworn into office on December 13, 2021.

References 

1948 births
Living people
20th-century American lawyers
21st-century American lawyers
Assistant United States Attorneys
Howard University alumni
Illinois lawyers
John Marshall Law School (Chicago) alumni
Lawyers from Washington, D.C.
United States Attorneys for the Central District of Illinois